The Shire of Mortlake was a local government area about  west of Melbourne, the state capital of Victoria, Australia.

History

Mortlake was incorporated as a road district on 20 July 1860, and became a shire on 26 January 1864.

On 23 September 1994, the Shire of Mortlake was abolished, and along with the Borough of Port Fairy, the Shires of Belfast and Minhamite, parts of the Shires of Dundas, Mount Rouse, Warrnambool, and the Tower Hill Reserve, was merged into the newly created Shire of Moyne.

Wards

The Shire of Mortlake was divided into four ridings on 7 June 1978, each of which elected three councillors:
 Ballangeich Riding
 Darlington Riding
 Mortlake Riding
 Woorndoo Riding

Towns and localities
 Ballangeich
 Darlington
 Dundonnell
 Ellerslie
 Hexham
 Kolora
 Mortlake*
 The Sisters
 Woorndoo

* Council seat.

Population

* Estimate in the 1958 Victorian Year Book.

References

External links
 Victorian Places - Mortlake and Mortlake Shire

Mortlake